Dendrobium fellowsii, commonly known as the native damsel orchid, is an epiphytic or lithophytic orchid in the family Orchidaceae and has upright pseudobulbs, up to five leaves and groups of up to five pale green or yellowish flowers with a deep purple labellum. It grows in tropical North Queensland.

Description 

The side lobes are relatively large and curve upwards and the middle lobe is broad with two parallel ridges. Flowering occurs from October to January.

Taxonomy and naming
Dendrobium fellowsii was first formally described in 1870 by Ferdinand von Mueller from a specimen collected near Rockingham Bay by John Dallachy. The description was published in Fragmenta phytographiae Australiae and the specific epithet (fellowsii) honours Thomas Howard Fellows.

Distribution and habitat
The native damsel orchid grows on trees or shrubs with stringy or flaky bark, in deep gullies or around the edges of large granite sheets in rainforest between the Mount Finnigan in the Cedar Bay National Park and Townsville in Queensland and in New Guinea and the Solomon Islands.

Conservation
This orchid is classed as "vulnerable" under the Queensland Government Nature Conservation Act 1992.

References 

fellowsii
Orchids of Queensland
Epiphytic orchids
Plants described in 1870
Taxa named by Ferdinand von Mueller